Jackson Parish (French: Paroisse de Jackson) is a parish in the northern part of the U.S. state of Louisiana. As of the 2020 census, the population was 15,031. The parish seat is Jonesboro. The parish was formed in 1845 from parts of Claiborne, Ouachita, and Union Parishes. In the twentieth century, this part of the state had several small industrial mill towns, such as Jonesboro.

East of Jonesboro is the Jimmie Davis State Park, which includes Caney Lake Reservoir.

History
Jackson Parish was founded in 1845 after Indian Removal and named for President Andrew Jackson.

Civil War
During the American Civil War Confederate General Richard Taylor sent five companies into Jackson and Winn parishes to arrest conscripts who failed to report for duty, and to halt jayhawker groups in the area.

20th century to present
Jonesboro became an industrial mill town in the 20th century, producing lumber and turpentine products from the pine forests. Industrialization stimulated its growth. By the 1950s and 1960s, numerous African Americans had become industrial workers. Many were veterans of World War II and the Korean War, and they began to press to gain civil rights in the segregated state and region. Ku Klux Klan chapters were active here, and they intimidated and attacked civil rights activists.

In November 1964 Rev. Frederick Douglass Kirkpatrick, ordained that year as a minister of the Church of God in Christ, and Earnest "Chilly Willy" Thomas founded the Deacons for Defense and Justice, an organized African-American, armed self-defense group to protect activists and their families.

In February 1965, these two men and other CORE workers traveled 300 miles to Bogalusa, Louisiana, another small mill town, where they founded another chapter of the Deacons. They advised local activists on strategies of self-defense. They helped found chapters of the Deacons in other cities of Louisiana, as well as in Mississippi and Alabama in these years.

Geography

Major highways
  U.S. Highway 167
  Louisiana Highway 4
  Louisiana Highway 34

Adjacent parishes
 Lincoln Parish (north)
 Ouachita Parish (northeast)
 Caldwell Parish (southeast)
 Winn Parish (south)
 Bienville Parish (west)

Communities

Towns 
 Chatham
 Eros
 Jonesboro (parish seat and largest municipality)

Villages 
 East Hodge
 Hodge
 North Hodge
 Quitman

Unincorporated communities 
 Ansley
 Antioch
 Pleasant Hill
 Walker
 Weston

Demographics

According to the 2020 United States census, there were 15,031 people, 5,971 households, and 4,015 families residing in the parish. At the census of 2000, there were 15,397 people, 6,086 households, and 4,302 families residing in the parish. The population density was 27 people per square mile (10/km2). There were 7,338 housing units at an average density of 13 per square mile (5/km2).

Among the population in 2000, 31.70% had children under the age of 18 living with them, 52.80% were married couples living together, 14.40% had a female householder with no husband present, and 29.30% were non-families. 27.00% of all households were made up of individuals, and 13.50% had someone living alone who was 65 years of age or older. The average household size was 2.48 and the average family size was 3.01.

In 2000, the racial makeup of the parish was 71.01% White, 27.87% Black or African American, 0.29% Native American, 0.21% Asian, 0.01% Pacific Islander, 0.24% from other races, and 0.37% from two or more races.  0.61% of the population were Hispanic or Latino of any race. By 2020, its racial makeup was 65.84% non-Hispanic white, 26.25% Black or African American, 0.23% Native American, 0.97% Asian, 0.03% Pacific Islander, 3.57% two or more races, and 3.11% Hispanic or Latino of any race.

Among the 2000 population, the median income for a household in the parish was $28,352, and the median income for a family was $36,317. Males had a median income of $31,977 versus $19,992 for females. The per capita income for the parish was $15,354. About 16.00% of families and 19.80% of the population were below the poverty line, including 26.30% of those under age 18 and 15.80% of those age 65 or over. In 2020, the median household income increased to $41,298 with home-owners paying $434 a month for monthly-housing costs.

Politics
Jackson Parish was historically part of the Solid South, as Louisiana had disenfranchised most blacks in the state at the turn of the century, as had other southern states. This made the Republican Party non-competitive in the state and region, and excluded blacks from politics into the 1960s. The conservative whites consistently voted for Democratic candidates in the one-party region. Governor Al Smith of New York received 100 percent of the vote in 1928 (from white voters) in his losing race against Herbert C. Hoover.

In the 1960s, the majority of conservative white voters began to shift their support to Republican presidential candidates, and then to those at the state level. In 1960, Richard M. Nixon led parishwide with 43.9 percent against both John F. Kennedy and a rival slate of unpledged segregationist electors. These included future Governor David C. Treen and Leander Perez of Plaquemines Parish. In that election, blacks were still disenfranchised.

Since the late 20th century, Democrat Bill Clinton and Republican George W. Bush each carried the parish twice. In 1992, Clinton polled 3,370 votes (44.5 percent) to Republican George Herbert Walker Bush's 3,072 (40.6 percent). Another 882 ballots (11.7 percent) were held by Ross Perot of Texas, who ran as an Independent and thereafter founded his Reform Party.

In the 2008 U.S. presidential election, Republican U.S. Senator John McCain of Arizona outpolled Barack H. Obama of Illinois by 30 percentage points. In 2012, Republican Mitt Romney carried Jackson Parish.with 5,132 votes (68.2 percent) to President Obama's 2,305 ballots (30.6 percent), a margin of nearly 38 percentage points.

Education
Public schools in Jackson Parish are operated by the elected Jackson Parish School Board.

National Guard
A Company 199TH FSB (Forward Support Battalion) of the 256TH IBCT resides in Jonesboro, Louisiana. This unit has deployed twice to Iraq in 2004-5 and 2010. Also deployed in 1990 for Operation Desert Shield/Desert Storm.

Notable people
 Rodney Alexander, Republican U.S. representative
 H. Welborn Ayres, judge of the Second Judicial District Court in Jonesboro, 1942–1953
 Robert C. Culpepper, Jackson Parish native, clerk of court from 1900 to 1908, state senator from 1908 to 1912, and judge in Alexandria from 1924 to 1942
 Marvin T. Culpepper, member of the Louisiana House of Representatives from Jackson Parish from 1964 to 1968
 Jimmie Davis, Democratic former governor and singer by profession, born in Jackson Parish in 1899.
 Randy Ewing, former Louisiana State Senate President and a 2003 Democratic gubernatorial contender.
 James R. Fannin, state representative from Jackson Parish since 2003
 E.L. "Bubba" Henry, former Democratic Speaker of the Louisiana House of Representatives, served in the House from District 13 from 1968 to 1980, the last eight of those years as Speaker. Also served as chairman of the 1973 convention which drafted the Louisiana Constitution currently in effect, and as Commissioner of Administration under Governor Dave Treen from 1980 to 1984.  
 Arnold R. Kilpatrick, former president of Northwestern State University in Natchitoches
 George T. Walker, president of the University of Louisiana at Monroe from 1958 to 1976, was born and reared in the Wyatt Community of Jackson Parish.

Gallery

See also

 Historical romance author Jennifer Blake lives in Quitman.
 National Register of Historic Places listings in Jackson Parish, Louisiana

References

 
Louisiana parishes
1845 establishments in Louisiana
Populated places established in 1845